Nigel Paul Smith (born 3 January 1958) is an English former professional footballer who played as a central defender in the Football League for Brentford and Cambridge United.

Club career

Early years 
Smith began his career with hometown club Banstead Athletic, before moving to the reserve team at Second Division club Queens Park Rangers, for which he made 20 appearances.

Brentford 
In March 1975, Smith transferred to Fourth Division club Brentford and was as a regular in the team during the 1975–76 and 1976–77 seasons. After the appointment of Bill Dodgin, Smith fell out of favour and made just a handful of appearances during the 1977–78 promotion-winning season. Smith had his contract cancelled and departed the Bees in October 1978, after making 96 appearances for the club.

Cambridge United 
Smith moved up to the Second Division to sign for Cambridge United in November 1978, but made just one substitute appearance for the club.

Non-league football 
Smith saw out his career with spells at Isthmian League clubs Woking and Metropolitan Police.

International career 
During the 1975–76 season, Smith was called up to train with the England U18 squad, but failed to appear in a match. He later represented the England Police team.

Personal life 
After retiring from professional football, Smith joined the Metropolitan Police.

Career statistics

References

External links
 

1958 births
Living people
People from Banstead
English footballers
Association football defenders
Brentford F.C. players
Cambridge United F.C. players
Metropolitan Police F.C. players
Banstead Athletic F.C. players
English Football League players
Isthmian League players
Queens Park Rangers F.C. players
Woking F.C. players